Harry Wilson (16 July 1885 – 25 July 1972) was an Australian rules footballer who played with South Melbourne in the Victorian Football League (VFL).

Wilson came to South Melbourne from West Melbourne at the start of the 1907 season. He was injured at start of season but made his debut against Fitzroy in Round 7. He was a back pocket defender for South Melbourne in their 1907 VFL Grand Final loss to Carlton.

He was dropped after two rounds in 1908 and obtained a permit to move to Prahran in June 1908 where he played for the next few years.

References

1885 births
1972 deaths
Australian rules footballers from New South Wales
West Melbourne Football Club players
Sydney Swans players
Prahran Football Club players
Newtown Australian Football Club players